Pluricontinentalism was a geopolitical concept, positing that Portugal was a transcontinental country and a unitary nation-state consisting of continental Portugal and its overseas provinces.

With origins as early as the 14th century, pluricontinentalism gained official state sponsorship in the Estado Novo regime.

It was the idea that Portugal was not a colonial empire (Portuguese Empire) but a singular nation-state spread across continents (hence the name). As such, overseas possessions were a part of Portuguese identity.

The first time that Portugal was a pluricontinental country was during the reign of Maria I of Portugal, with the creation of the United Kingdom of Portugal, Brazil and the Algarves, when the Portuguese court was living in Brazil and Rio de Janeiro served as the capital for the country.

The idea of pluricontinentalism quickly collapsed following the Carnation Revolution in 1974.

People associated with pluricontinentalism 
António Vieira
Luís da Cunha
Maria I of Portugal
John VI of Portugal
Pedro IV of Portugal
António de Oliveira Salazar

See also 
Eurasianism 
Atlanticism
Lusotropicalism
Lusosphere
List of former transcontinental countries
Luso-Africans
Assimilados
Lançados
Mestiços
Órfãs do Rei
Retornados

References 

Portuguese Empire
Imperialism
Estado Novo (Portugal)
History of the Atlantic Ocean
Maritime history of Portugal
Lusophone culture